The East Sumatran banded langur (Presbytis percura), also known as the East Sumatran banded surili, is a species of monkey in the family Cercopithecidae.  It was formerly considered a subspecies of the Raffles' banded langur Presbytis femoralis, but genetic analysis revealed it to be a separate species.  Its range is restricted to the Riau Province of east-central Sumatra.  Due to its declining population and restricted range in small, isolated forests subject to high rates of deforestation, the IUCN declared it to be a critically endangered species in 2020.

References

Presbytis
Primates of Indonesia
Endemic fauna of Sumatra
Taxa named by Marcus Ward Lyon Jr.
Mammals described in 1908
Taxobox binomials not recognized by IUCN